Gujratan  is a village in Phagwara Tehsil in Kapurthala district of Punjab State, India. The village is administrated by a Sarpanch, who is an elected representative.

Demography 
According to the report published by Census India in 2011, Gujratan has 68 houses with the total population of 288 persons of which 146 are male and 142 females. Literacy rate of Gujratan is 79.62%, higher than the state average of 75.84%.  The population of children in the age group 0–6 years is 23 which is 7.99% of the total population.  Child sex ratio is approximately 1091, higher than the state average of 846.

Population data 

As per census 2011, 113 people were engaged in work activities out of the total population of Gujratan village which includes 97 males and 16 females.  According to census survey report 2011, 91.15% workers (Employment or Earning more than 6 Months) describe their work as main work and 8.85% workers are involved in Marginal activity providing livelihood for less than 6 months.

Caste  
The village has schedule caste (SC) constitutes 65.28% of total population of the village and it doesn't have any Schedule Tribe (ST) population.

References

External links
  Villages in Kapurthala
 Kapurthala Villages List

Villages in Kapurthala district